Horia Roman (14 July 1894 – 1990) was a Romanian bobsledder. He competed in the four-man event at the 1928 Winter Olympics.

References

1894 births
1990 deaths
Romanian male bobsledders
Olympic bobsledders of Romania
Bobsledders at the 1928 Winter Olympics
Sportspeople from Bucharest